Hidden Gems is the second studio album by Canadian blues rock band, The Blue Stones. The album was released on March 19, 2021 through eOne.

Track listing

References

External links 
 Hiden Gems at Bandcamp

2021 albums
The Blue Stones albums
MNRK Music Group albums